Monument Records is an American record label in Washington, D.C. named for the Washington Monument, founded in 1958 by Fred Foster, Buddy Deane (a prominent Baltimore disc jockey at WTTG), and business manager Jack Kirby. Buddy Deane soon left the company, and in the early '60s bought KOTN in Pine Bluff, Arkansas, where he lived in retirement until his death. Foster and Kirby relocated to the Nashville suburb of Hendersonville, Tennessee. Monument's releases include a variety of genres including rock and roll, country, jazz, and rhythm and blues.

Sony Music revived the Monument label in 2017 in a joint venture with manager Jason Owen and songwriter/producer Shane McAnally, both serving as co-presidents.

History
In the beginning Monument was the first label to be distributed by London Records.

Monument Records' first release (October 1958) was also the label's first hit. Billy Grammer's "Gotta Travel On" became a US Top 5 Billboard record chart success which sold over 900,000 copies. It also spawned a nationwide dance craze called "The Shag".

The signing of former Sun Records singer Roy Orbison brought more success to Monument Records, beginning with the 1960 release "Only the Lonely." By 1961, London Records was distributing more than forty independent companies, prompting Foster to move Monument to the independent-distributor network.

In 1962, Monument Records made history when it released "Too Many Chicks" and "Jealous Heart" by Leona Douglas, the first country & western recording by an African-American woman.

In 1971, Foster signed a worldwide distribution agreement with CBS Records. The distribution agreement lasted until 1976. Foster switched distribution to PolyGram which lasted until 1982, and then once again CBS handled distribution until 1990.

In addition to Orbison, Monument became home to a number of other artists including Robert Knight, Kris Kristofferson, Bob Moore, Jeannie Seely, Boots Randolph, Dolly Parton, Ray Stevens, Cindy Walker, Tony Joe White, Charlie McCoy, Willie Nelson, J.K. Coltrain, Tommy Roe, The Velvets, Connie Smith, Larry Jon Wilson, Larry Gatlin, and Robert Mitchum.

Foster started a soul and R&B label Sound Stage 7 in 1963. Artists on Sound Stage 7 included Joe Simon, The Dixie Belles, Arthur Alexander, and Ivory Joe Hunter. Another Monument sublabel was Rising Sons Records.

Foster invested heavily in a banking venture in the 1980s, and sustained disastrous financial losses. That led to the forced sale of Monument and its publishing counterpart, Combine Music Group, in 1990. CBS Records acquired the Monument catalog, and its successor company Sony Music reactivated the label in 1997 as a country label. Some successful artists signed to Monument during this era were Little Big Town and Dixie Chicks. Monument Records catalog is managed by Sony Music's Legacy Recordings unit.

2017 relaunch 
In January 2017, Sony Music announced it had revived the iconic Monument label in a joint venture with Sandbox Entertainment CEO and manager Jason Owen (Little Big Town, Faith Hill, Kacey Musgraves) and songwriter/producer Shane McAnally (Kenny Chesney, Old Dominion, Sam Hunt). Owen and McAnally serve as co-presidents and have signed artists Caitlyn Smith and Walker Hayes.

See also
List of record labels
Sony Nashville

References

External links
 Bsnpubs.com
 Discography for Monument Records

Defunct record labels of the United States
Record labels established in 1958
Rock and roll record labels
American country music record labels
Rhythm and blues record labels
1958 establishments in Washington, D.C.
Sony Music
Jazz record labels